Bhadra Wildlife Sanctuary is a protected area and tiger reserve as part of the Project Tiger, situated in Chikkamagaluru district,  south of Bhadravathi city,  20 km from Tarikere town, northwest of Chikkamagaluru and 283 km from Bengaluru city in Karnataka state, India. Bhadra sanctuary has a wide range of flora and fauna and is a popular place for day outings.

Geography
Bhadra sanctuary consists of two adjacent sections. The main western Lakkavalli-Muthodi section lies from 13˚22’ to 13˚47’ N latitude, 75˚29’ to 75˚45’ E longitude and the smaller eastern Bababudangiri section from 13˚30’ to 13˚33’ N latitude and 75˚44’ to 75˚47’ E longitude.

The sanctuary is surrounded by the scenic hills and steep slopes of the Mullayanagiri, Hebbegiri, Gangegiri and Bababudangiri hills. Mullayanagiri peak in the Baba Budan Giri Range near the southeast edge of the sanctuary is the highest peak between the Himalayas and the Nilgiris.

The Manikyadhara Falls is located on the nearby sacred Baba Budan Giri Hill, The tributaries of the Bhadra river flow west through the sanctuary.

Jagara and Sirivase are the villages located within the sanctuary. Bhadravathi, Tarikere and Birur are cities nearby. Larger metropolitan cities are well connected to Bhadravthi and Birur by bus and rail. There is frequent local bus service from Bhadravathi to both Bhadra Dam and Bhadra WLS.

Bhadra Wildlife Sanctuary is located at Lakkavalli, Karnataka; the nearest cities is Tarikere, Birur and Bhadravathi.

Climate
Temperatures vary from 10˚ to 35 °C and mean annual rainfall varies from 1200 mm to 2600 mm.

History
The area was first declared as 'Jagara Valley Wildlife Sanctuary' in 1951 by the then government of its surroundings, the area was extended to its present extent and renamed to Bhadra Wildlife Sanctuary in 1974.

The Wildlife Sanctuary was declared as a Project Tiger Reserve in 1998. Bhadra is the first tiger reserve in the country to complete a successful village relocation program.

Biology and ecology

Bhadra Wildlife Sanctuary is the biodiversity hotspot. Most of the area consists the wet deciduous forest, moist deciduous forest and green forests.
Phenology has been defined as the study of cyclical biological events. In plants, this can include leafing, flowering and fruiting phenophases. Phenological studies were on going to know the biology of tree species (9,10,11,12)

Flora
Bhadra supports more than 120 plant species. One typical  of tropical dry
deciduous forest had 46 species, 37 genera and 24 families. Combretaceae was the most abundant family in the forest. Indigoberry (Randia dumetorum) was the dominant species.

Throughout the sanctuary the common species include crepe myrtle (lanceolata), kadam, thaasal (tiliaefolia), simpoh (pentagyna), teak, kindal, Indian-laurel, rosewood, Indian kino tree, white teak, fig tree, mangosteen, Kydia calycina, indigo, toddy palm, Ceylon oak, jalari, jamba tree, axlewood, slow match tree, thorny bamboo and clumping bamboo.

It is the habitat of valuable teak and rosewood. Other commercial timber in the sanctuary includes: mathi, honne, Nandi, tadasalu and kindal. There is also bamboo and several types of medicinal plants.

Fauna

An estimated 33 tigers are found in Bhadra. Other animals in the sanctuary include elephant, Indian Leopard, gaur, sloth bear, wild boar, black leopard, jungle cat, jackal, wild dog, sambar, spotted deer, barking deer, mouse deer, common langur, bonnet macaque, slender loris, small Indian civet, common palm civet, pangolin, porcupine, flying squirrel and the Malabar giant squirrel.

Small carnivores found in the Bhadra Wildlife Sanctuary include leopard cat, rusty-spotted cat, ruddy mongoose, stripe-necked mongoose and otters.

Reptiles
Some of the reptiles commonly sighted in this park are common vine snake, king cobra, common cobra, Russell's viper, bamboo pit viper, rat snake, olive keelback, common wolf snake, common Indian monitor, Draco or gliding lizards and marsh crocodiles.

Birds
 
Bhadra sanctuary has more than 300 species of birds, some endemic to this region and some migratory. Some of the species are grey junglefowl, red spurfowl, painted bush quail, emerald dove, Osprey, southern green imperial pigeon, great black woodpecker, Malabar parakeet, hill myna, ruby-throated bulbul, shama, Malabar trogon, Malabar whistling thrush, four species of hornbill and racquet-tailed drongo.

Butterflies
Some of the butterflies in Bhadra sanctuary are yamfly, baronet, crimson rose butterfly, southern birdwing, tailed jay, great orange tip, bamboo tree brown, and blue pansy.

Threats
A growing threat is human population in the villages close to the sanctuary and encroachment in areas surrounding Bhadra Wildlife Sanctuary. Grazing by the thousands of cattle that belong to the villagers are a threat. Livestock carry diseases like foot and mouth disease to the herbivores in the park. During the 1989-99 time period, rinderpest wiped out most of the Gaur population, which numbered more than a thousand, reducing the population to its present numbers. With proactive programs of inoculating local cattle, the population of Gaur is again on the rise.

Another concern due to closeness of the population is procurement of non-timber forest products for commercial purposes and the procurement of timber for firewood. These affect the health of the forest in a long run. The other large threats are fishing and illegal poaching of wild animals.

Management practices of the forest department are habitat improvement, boundary consolidation, protection against poaching and fires, and infrastructure development. However, operating funds are insufficient and often delayed and the sanctuary management is understaffed. There are problems with frequent fires which adversely affect the habitat and biodiversity of Bhadra. Timber smuggling of valuable trees is a big problem.

Tunga-Bhadra Lift Irrigation Project promises to bring water to the rain shadow areas of Chikmagalur district by transferring water from the Tunga River to the Bhadra River, however this poses a threat of disturbance to the natural habitat of Bhadra sanctuary.

Gallery

References

9. Nanda, A, Krishna Murthy, Y.L and Suresh, H.S. (2013). Canopy trees phenology in a tropical dry deciduous and evergreen forest of Bhadra wildlife sanctuary, Karnataka, India. African journal of plant science 7(5): 170-175.
10. Nanda, A, Prakasha, H.M. Krishnamurthy, Y.L. and Suresh, H.S. (2012). Leafing phenology of canopy, under-storey trees and seasonality in a tropical evergreen forest of bhadra wildlife sanctuary, Karnataka, southern India. Indian Journal of Forestry, vol. 35 (4): 457-462. 
11. Nanda, A, Prakasha, H.M. Krishnamurthy, Y.L. and Suresh, H.S. (2011).  Phenology of leaf flushing, flower initiation and fruit maturation in dry deciduous and evergreen forests of Bhadra Wildlife Sanctuary, Karnataka, southern India. Our Nature, 9: 89-99.
12. Nanda, A, Prakasha, H.M. Krishnamurthy, Y.L. and Suresh, H.S. (2010). Phenology of a tropical dry forest: study from Bhadra Wildlife Sanctuary, Karnataka, peninsular India. Indian Journal of Forestry, vol. 33 (2): 167-172

Other links

A captivating image of 2 tigers staring at an adult Gaur in Bhadra Tiger Reserve
'Wildlifing in Bhadra' A travel story on Bhadra Tiger Reserve, published in Sunday Herald (Deccan Herald), Bangalore, 1 July 2001.
'End of conflict' A story on the once man-animal conflict in Bhadra sanctuary.
Excellent images from Bhadra Tiger Reserve
WildLife conservation in Bhadra 

Tiger reserves of India
Wildlife sanctuaries in Karnataka
Wildlife sanctuaries of the Western Ghats
North Western Ghats moist deciduous forests
North Western Ghats montane rain forests
Protected areas established in 1951
1951 establishments in Mysore State
Tourist attractions in Chikkamagaluru district